Administrative division of regions of Ukraine is not homogeneous, but it is standardized. There are three types of regional  subdivisions: raion, raion within city, and city of regional significance (jurisdiction).

Not all regions have each type of those subdivisions. The most inconsistent type of division is raion within city. Each of those subdivisions are governed by their own district state administration chairman appointed by the President of Ukraine on the recommendation of a governor (chairman of the Regional State Administration). The legislative state power is electable and consists of a district council which is headed by a mayor in cities and a chairman in other settlements.

Each regional subdivision is subdivided into smaller territories governed by local settlements' council (rada) and are named after them.

List of subdivisions
 Raions
 Raion within city
 Cities of regional significance

External links
 

 
Regional subdivision
Ukraine 2